Yallappagouda Shankargouda Patil (6 July 1 – 25 November 2010) commonly known as Y. S. Patil was an Indian Politician and social activist.

Personal life 
Born in Hombal, Gadag district, Patil often participated in social, cultural activities. He presided Jagadguru Shankaracharya Sanskrit Pathashala and was also a member of Karnatak University Senate which shows that he often got involved in educational management and religious organizations. He was also the president and a life member of Karnataka Vidyavardhaka Sangha. He was popular for flamboyance. Patil was also a popular writer who wrote many articles in newspapers.

Political life 
He joined Rashtriya Swayamsevak Sangh in 1942 and was also affiliated with Akhil Bharatiya Vidyarthi Parishad since 1954. He was a member of Bharatiya Jana Sangh from 1955 till it's merger to Janata Party in 1977. He was elected to Mysore Legislative Council 3 times (twice as a Bharatiya Jana Sangh candidate and once from Janata Party representing Graduates' Constituency. He was detained under M.I.S.A. as a Political prisoner in Central Prisons, Karnataka for 13 months during Jaya Prakash movement during 1975–76.

Death 
He died on 25 November 2010 in a hospital in Dharwad after a brief illness.

References 

Living people
1927 births
2010 deaths
Bharatiya Janata Party politicians from Karnataka
Janata Party politicians
Bharatiya Jana Sangh politicians
People from Gadag district
Members of the Karnataka Legislative Council